Estonian Rally Championship is the national rally championship in Estonia, held annually since 1959.

Champions

Champion without notes is considered absolute winner, others show the winning class.

References

External links
Season 2022 in Estonian Rally Championship ewrc-results.com
Estonian Autosport Union 

Rally racing series
Rally Championship
Rally
Recurring sporting events established in 1959
1959 establishments in Estonia